Pachymerium syriacum is a species of centipede in Geophilidae family that is endemic to Dodecanese Islands. The original description of this species is based on a female specimen measuring 110 mm in length with 87 pairs of legs. Some authorities assign this species to another genus under the name Gnathoribautia syriaca.

References

Geophilomorpha
Animals described in 1903
Endemic fauna of Greece
Myriapods of Europe